Calathus auctus is a species of ground beetle from the Platyninae subfamily that is endemic to the Canary Islands.

References

auctus
Beetles described in 1862
Endemic beetles of the Canary Islands